Tell Mama is the seventh studio album by American singer Etta James.  Her second album release for Cadet Records, produced by Rick Hall at his FAME Studios in Muscle Shoals, Alabama, it was James's first album since 1964 to enter the Billboard 200 chart.  It contained her first Top 10 R&B hits since 1964 – the title cut and "Security".  The "Tell Mama" single gave James her all-time highest Billboard Hot 100 position, reaching number 23.

Background
Tell Mama was recorded at the FAME Studios in Muscle Shoals, Alabama, on the encouragement of Leonard Chess, who successfully convinced James to record the album there. Allmusic reviewer, Bill Dahl praised the album's production, called its sessions, "skin-tight." At Muscle Shoals, producers were able to mix her voice in order for it to sound stronger on previously-distorted high notes. The album's title track became one of the biggest hits of James's career, becoming her first Top 10 hit in four years and her highest-peaking single on the Billboard Pop chart, reaching #23. It has since been considered one of her all-time classics. The album's cover of Otis Redding's "Security" also became a major hit, reaching the Top 20 on the R&B singles chart, while also making the Pop Top 40.

Besides a cover version of Redding's composition, other cover versions included Jimmy Hughes's "Don't Lose Your Good Thing" and a pair of copyrights by Don Covay. It also featured the title track's B-side, "I'd Rather Go Blind," which was originally not a hit, however it later became one of James's signature songs. In the 1990s, Tell Mama was remastered and re-released on MCA/Chess. The album was remastered by Erick Labson at Universal Mastering Studios-West in North Hollywood, California. A compilation version of the album was later released and included ten additional bonus tracks, including cover versions of David Houston's, "Almost Persuaded" and Sonny & Cher's "I Got You Babe."

Legacy

In a retrospective review for AllMusic, Bill Dahl felt the album to be "one of her best and most soul-searing Cadet albums." Dahl called the title track "relentlessly driving" and "I'd Rather Go Blind," "a moving soul ballad." He also said that the album's producers, "really did themselves proud behind Miss Peaches."

In 2000 it was voted number 667 in Colin Larkin's All Time Top 1000 Albums.

James' cover of "I Got You Babe" was featured in a 2021 TV commercial for Walmart.

Track listing
Side one
"Tell Mama" – (Clarence Carter, Marcus Daniel, Wilbur Terrell) 2:20 (also released as a single: Cadet 5578a)
"I'd Rather Go Blind" – (Billy Foster, Ellington Jordan, Etta James) 2:33 (Cadet 5578b)
"Watch Dog" – (Don Covay) 2:06
"The Love of My Man" – (Ed Townsend) 2:37
"I'm Gonna Take What He's Got" – (Don Covay) 2:32 (Cadet 5594b)
"The Same Rope" – (Leonard Caston, Jr., Lloyd Webster) 2:39

Side two
"Security" – (Otis Redding) 2:44 (Cadet 5594a)
"Steal Away" – (Jimmy Hughes) 2:19 (Cadet 5630b)
"My Mother In-Law" – (George David, Lee Diamond) 2:20
"Don't Lose Your Good Thing" – (Rick Hall, Spooner Oldham) 2:26
"It Hurts Me So Much" – (Charles Chalmers) 2:34
"Just a Little Bit" – (Rosco Gordon) 2:11

Bonus tracks
"Do Right Woman, Do Right Man - (Chips Moman, Dan Penn)"
"You Took It"
"I Worship the Ground You Walk On" (Cadet 5606b)
"I Got You Babe" (Cadet 5606a)
"You Got It" (Cadet 5620a)
"I've Gone Too Far"
"Misty"
"Almost Persuaded" (Cadet 5630a)
"Fire" (Cadet 5620b)
"Do Right Woman, Do Right Man (Alternate Version)"

Personnel
 Etta James – lead vocals
 Gene "Bowlegs" Miller – trumpet
 James Mitchell, Aaron Varnell – saxophone
 Floyd Newman – baritone saxophone
 George Davis, Spooner Oldham – keyboards
 Carl Banks, Barry Beckett – organ
 Marvell Thomas – piano
 Jimmy Ray Jenkins, Albert Lowe – guitar
 David Hood – bass guitar
 Roger Hawkins – drums
 Charles Chalmers – background vocals

Chart positions
Album – Billboard (North America)

Singles - Billboard (United States)

References

1968 albums
Etta James albums
MCA Records albums
Chess Records albums
Cadet Records albums